Wang Tao (born December 13, 1967 in Beijing) is a retired Chinese table tennis player, the current head coach of the Bayi Gongshang club in the China Table Tennis Super League, and a member of the Chinese Olympic Committee.
Wang Tao is a left-handed player who utilizes the shakehand grip, known for using short pimpled rubber on his backhand and regular inverted rubber on his forehand. Due to the special characteristics of short pimpled rubber being able to hit through and resist spin, Wang Tao's play style is unique, as he was able to rely on the quick hitting motion on his backhand to directly attack serves with heavy spin or make controlled shots at wide angles against his opponents. Wang Tao positions himself close to the table, attacking with great speed and surprising his opponents with unexpected shots. 

Wang Tao was an influential figure, making great contributions to the revival of Chinese dominance in the sport of table tennis in a time when European countries like Sweden and Austria dominated the world stage (winning the men's team event during the 1995 table tennis world championships). 

Wang Tao was mentioned in season 4, episode 8 of the American television series The Office.  In the episode, entitled "The Deposition", the character Dwight Schrute mentions Wang Tao as one of his table tennis heroes.

External links
Chinese Olympic Committee profile
ITTF profile

1967 births
Living people
Chinese male table tennis players
Olympic table tennis players of China
Table tennis players at the 1992 Summer Olympics
Table tennis players at the 1996 Summer Olympics
Olympic gold medalists for China
Olympic medalists in table tennis
Asian Games medalists in table tennis
Table tennis players from Beijing
Table tennis players at the 1994 Asian Games
Asian Games gold medalists for China
Asian Games bronze medalists for China
Medalists at the 1994 Asian Games

Medalists at the 1996 Summer Olympics
Medalists at the 1992 Summer Olympics
Olympic silver medalists for China